"Serenade in Blue" is a 1942 Big Band song composed by Harry Warren, with lyrics written by Mack Gordon. It was introduced in the 1942 film Orchestra Wives by Glenn Miller and His Orchestra, sung by Lynn Bari in the film but dubbed by Pat Friday.

Background

Glenn Miller and His Orchestra released the song as an RCA Victor 78, 27935-A, which peaked at #2 on the Billboard pop singles chart.

The RCA Victor recording by Glenn Miller and His Orchestra featured vocalist Ray Eberle with backing vocals by The Modernaires. This record was the year's eleventh-best selling recording in the United States according to Billboard magazine, after having spent fifteen weeks on the Billboard charts.

Notable recordings
 (Johnny Weaver) ON 23RD February 2019
Tex Beneke with the Glenn Miller Orchestra
Al Caiola
Chris Connor - I Walk with Music (2002)
Vic Damone (1954)
Doris Day - Doris Day's Sentimental Journey (1964)
Billy Eckstine Big Band (April 21, 1947)
Dinah Shore
Frances Langford
Jimmy Dorsey
Paul Whiteman
Erroll Garner (May 12, 1950)
Stan Getz - West Coast Jazz (1955)
Jackie Gleason - Body and Soul (1995)
Benny Goodman - Benny Goodman and His Great Vocalists, Dick Haymes on vocals, Legacy/Columbia, 1995
Dexter Gordon - Landslide (1962)
Dick Haymes - Richard the Lion-Hearted - Dick Haymes that is! (1960)
Harry James - Soft Lights, Sweet Trumpet (Columbia CL 6207, 1952)
Bert Kaempfert - Serenade in Blue (1967)
Syd Lawrence - Remembers Glenn Miller (1989)
Lou Levy Trio in 1955
Gloria Lynne
Glenn Miller and His Orchestra (with vocal refrain by Ray Eberle and The Modernaires). It was recorded in Chicago on May 20, 1942 and was released by Glenn Miller and His Orchestra on RCA Victor Records as a 78 single, catalogue number 27935A, reaching #2 on the Billboard charts.
Peter Nero in 1962
Oscar Peterson Trio - Plays Harry Warren (1954), Pastel Moods (1956)
André Previn and David Rose - Like Blue (1960)
Jimmy Rowles Trio - Rare, But Well Done with Art Mardigan and Red Mitchell (1954)
Doc Severinsen - The Tonight Show Band with Doc Severinsen, Vol. II (1987)
Frank Sinatra - Sinatra and Swingin' Brass (1962)
Mel Torme and George Shearing
Leslie Uggams
Brad Kane (dubbing Danny Strong) and Royal Crown Revue in the Buffy the Vampire Slayer episode Superstar (2000).
Randy Weston Trio - With These Hands (1956)

References 

Songs with music by Harry Warren
Songs with lyrics by Mack Gordon
1942 songs
1942 singles
Glenn Miller songs
Benny Goodman songs
Frank Sinatra songs
Doris Day songs
Jazz compositions
Pop standards
Songs written for films